The Tydd Baronetcy of Lamberton, Queen's County was a title in the Baronetage of Ireland. It was created on 24 July 1795 for John Tydd of Lamberton Park, County Laois. He was the son of French Tydd and Elizabeth Moore. During a long career in politics (1778-1800) he sat in the Irish House of Commons for five constituencies in all.

He died without issue in December 1803, when the title became extinct.

Tydd Baronets, of Lamberton (1795)
Sir John Tydd, 1st Baronet (c.1740-1803)

Sources
Cokayne, G. E.  (1906)   Complete Baronetage Vol.5 Exeter  William Pollard and Co. p. 435

Extinct baronetcies in the Baronetage of Ireland